John Edward Baumgartner (born May 29, 1931) is an American former professional baseball player.

Baumgartner appeared in seven Major League games as a member of the 1953 Detroit Tigers and played six seasons (1950–1955) in minor league baseball. While he played third base exclusively in MLB, he also was an outfielder and first baseman in the minor leagues.

Baumgartner played college baseball at the University of Alabama, which qualified for the 1950 College World Series led by Baumgartner and other future big leaguers such as longtime MLB pitchers Frank Lary (who would become one of the Tigers' stalwart starting pitchers of the 1950s and early 1960s) and Al Worthington. Baumgartner signed with Detroit in 1950 and made the Tigers 1953 roster coming out of spring training. He started the first seven games of the regular season at third base for Detroit, collecting five hits (all singles) in 27 at bats and scoring three runs. In the field, he made two errors in 23 total chances for a fielding percentage of .913. Those would be Baumgartner's only games played in the Majors; he was sent back to the minors, and Ray Boone was eventually acquired from the Cleveland Indians to play the hot corner for Detroit.  In 657 minor league games, Baumgartner batted .261 with 624 hits.

In Charlie Metro's autobiography, he wrote this of his former player: "John Baumgartner played third base for me at Montgomery in 1953.  He was a fine physical specimen.  But he was like some ballplayers who just had a quirk, and I never knew how to overcome it.  They just couldn't meet the big league challenge, but he was a big league prospect.  He had power, good speed, a good arm, everything...."

References

External links

1931 births
Living people
Alabama Crimson Tide baseball players
Baseball players from Birmingham, Alabama
Buffalo Bisons (minor league) players
Detroit Tigers players
Durham Bulls players
Jamestown Falcons players
Little Rock Travelers players
Major League Baseball third basemen
Montgomery Grays players
Terre Haute Tigers players
Williamsport Tigers players